The Keuper Uplands ( or, more rarely Keuperwaldberge) are part of the South German Scarplands and cover an area of about 3,200 square kilometres.

The following regions belong to the Keuper Uplands (from southwest to northeast): the Kleiner Heuberg, Rammert, Schönbuch, Glemswald, Stromberg and Heuchelberg, Schurwald and Welzheim Forest, Swabian-Franconian Forest, Franconian Heights, Steigerwald and Hassberge. The southwesternmost Keuper escarpment in the area of the Baar does not have its own name because of its small size.

Natural region divisions 

The Keuper Uplands are divided into three natural region major unit groups which, in turn, are subdivided into major units, shown underneath in each case with three-figure index numbers (units of which only small areas lie on keuper are in italics) and ridges that are orographically separated from one another (basins and ridges on the perimeters have been omitted):
 (part of the South German Scarplands)
 (part of the 12 Neckar and Tauber Gäu Plateaux)
 124 Stromberg and Heuchelberg
124.1 Stromberg
124.2 Heuchelberg and Eppinger Hardt
 zu 10 Swabian Keuper-Lias Plains
 104 Schönbuch and Glemswald
 104.11 Rammert
 104.12/15 Schönbuch (in its narrower sense)
 104.20 Inner Glemswald
 107 Schurwald and Welzheim Forest
 107.0 Schurwald
 107.2 Berglen
 107.3 Welzheim Forest
 108 Swabian-Franconian Forest
108.00 Murrhardt Forest
108.11 Sulm Plateaue
108.13/14 Löwenstein Hills (in their narrower sense)
108.30 Kirnberg Forest
108.31 Sulzbach Forest
108.4 Mainhardt Forest 
108.5 Waldenburg Hills
108.60 Limpurg Hills 
108.70 Ellwangen Hills
 (zu 11 Franconian Keuper-Lias Land)
 114 Franconian Heights
 115 Steigerwald
 116 Haßberge
 (part of the 117 Itz-Baunach Hills)
 117.40 Zeilberge

Apart from the Stromber and Heuchelberg, which lie north of Schönbuch and Glemswald and outside the Keuper-Lias landscapes in the muschelkalk dominated Gäue, the landscapes in the above list along the Albtrauf, from which they are separated by the lias dominated forelands, are oriented in a northeasterly direction.

Landscape 

The landscape is characterised by the rock - keuper that gives it its name and is the uppermost and youngest lithostratigraphic group of the Germanic Trias. It exhibits a variety of depositions of sand beds and marine sediments.

The Keuper Uplands are largely forested because the soils that form on the keuper are not very fertile. Island clearings are found especially on the fertile loess or lias soils.

The very steep-sided V-shaped valleys that are typical of the Keuper Uplands are known here as klingen. Such klingen occur in the petrographically harder sandstone beds of the keuper, for example in the Stubensandstein. These rocks are able to resist significantly the erosion forces (especially side erosion) of water. In less erosion-resistant rocks of the keuper like the clays or marls, the valleys are more deeply carved out so that many wider-profiled valley are formed.

References

External links 
 Tobias Spaltenberger, Geoökologie des Keuperberglands (pdf file; 2.13 MB)
 Kerf, Kies und Letten - das Keuperland - Geologie und Weinbergsböden Württembergs, Teil 3. Ministerium für Ernährung und Ländlichen Raum Baden-Württemberg (MLR)

Natural regions of the South German Scarplands
Swabia